The 2022 North Dakota State Bison football team represented North Dakota State University as a member of the Missouri Valley Football Conference (MVFC) during the 2022 NCAA Division I FCS football season. The Bison were led by fourth-year head coach Matt Entz. They played their home games at the Fargodome in Fargo, North Dakota. 
The Bison finished their regular season with an overall record of 9-2 and 7-1 in MVFC play. NDSU received the number 3 overall seed in the FCS playoffs. The Bison then beat Montana in the second round, Samford in the quarterfinals, and Incarnate Word in the semifinals, before falling to topseed and archrival South Dakota State in the FCS National Championship. This was the program's first loss in the FCS title game, and only their third ever loss in a title game at any level.

Previous season
The Bison finished the 2021 season with a 14–1 record and a 7–1 record in the Missouri Valley Football Conference. They won the MVFC and made the FCS playoffs as the No. 2 overall seed in the country. They defeated Southern Illinois in the second round, East Tennessee State in the quarterfinals, James Madison in the Semifinals, before defeating Montana State in the FCS Championship Game.

Schedule

Game summaries

Regular season

Drake

North Carolina A&T

Arizona (FBS)

South Dakota

Youngstown State

Indiana State

South Dakota State

Illinois State

Western Illinois

Southern Illinois

North Dakota

NCAA Division I playoffs

Montana (second round)

Samford (quarterfinal)

Incarnate Word (semifinal)

South Dakota State (national championship)

Roster

Rankings

References

North Dakota State
North Dakota State Bison football seasons
North Dakota State
North Dakota State Bison football